Jeddah Raceway is a motor racetrack in Jeddah, Saudi Arabia. The project was approved by Prince Sultan bin Abdulaziz in 2006. It is home to the Jeddah Racing Academy, which opened in 2008.

Location
Jeddah Raceway is in King Abdullah Sports City in the Al-Asalah district of northern Jeddah,  between King Abdulaziz International Airport and South Obhur Beach.

References

Sport in Jeddah